Kevin Kiely (born 2 June 1953) is a poet, critic, author and playwright whose writings and public statements have met with controversy and also with support.

Early life
Kiely was born on 2 June 1953 in Warrenpoint, County Down, Northern Ireland. His grandfather's brother was the Olympian John Jesus Flanagan, inventor of the hammer for Slazenger America as used in the Olympic Games, and three-times record-breaking gold medallist. Kiely's childhood was spent in many parts of Ireland, due to his father's work as manager with the Munster & Leinster Bank. Aged 7, he was sent to Wimbledon, London to his aunt. In 1963 on the death of his father, John Francis Kiely, he was in the care of his guardian and uncle, Edward Vaughan-Neil who sent him to Mt St. Joseph’s Abbey, Roscrea where he was a boarder from 1966 to 1969. He completed his education in Blackrock College, Dublin, from 1969 to 1971.

Wandering, work, academic life
He became a field study technician for Smedley HP in Cambridgeshire 1973–1975 and wandered in Europe working part-time at various jobs while reading in the national libraries of many countries, but otherwise mainly residing in Paris and London. Kiely attended University College Galway in 1976, participating on the Art Council-funded National Writers Workshop, taught Literature in Colegio Xaloc, Barcelona and was made an honorary fellow of Iowa University in 1983. He holds a Masters in Literature from Trinity College in 2005 and a PhD from University College Dublin in 2009. His doctoral thesis on John L. Sweeney: Patron of Poetry at Harvard's Woodberry Poetry Room gained him an American Fulbright Award in 2007, enabling years of full-time lecturing at American universities including Boise State University and the University of Idaho, and research at Harvard. The doctoral thesis formed the basis of Harvard’s Patron: Jack of All Poets an A-Z critical study of modernist American poets associated with The Edward Woodberry Poetry Room Harvard University. Sweeney as Irish-American millionaire and patron, greatly contributed in terms of patronage to poets E. E. Cummings , Robert Frost, Ezra Pound, Wallace Stevens and many others which Kiely prefigured in various essays discussing poets and their patrons before the publication of Harvard's Patron: Jack of All Poets (2018).

Writings
Kiely co-edited The Belle, a counter-cultural magazine, with Maurice Scully from 1978 to 1979. He moved from Dublin to Spain where he taught at Colegio Xaloc and gave public lectures on poetry and literature.

Quintesse, published in 1982 in Dublin by Co-Op Books, found a New York publisher in 1985. During this period he was invited to the University of Iowa on the International Writing Programme Fellowship working with the American poet Paul Engel as well as poets Gary Snyder, Marvin Bell and Jorie Graham. Mere Mortals, an experimental pastiche of the post-Joycean novel, was published in 1989 in Dublin.

With publication of the biography of Francis Stuart author of the Penguin Classic Black List, Section H one of twenty-five novels, Kiely found support and condemnation because of Stuart’s conflicted life including the Second World War era in Berlin broadcasting at Haus des Rundfunks which had earned him the scandalous epithet the Irish Lord Haw-Haw. While the book was extensively reviewed, the long existing controversy over Stuart became amplified into further controversy. The book titled Francis Stuart: Artist and Outcast came out in Ireland and America, and Kiely's stance was seen by some as "diplomatic" whereas some others suggested that Kiely was "not writing the book that more opinionated readers, eager to prove Stuart's lapses, would have demanded." The re-issue of the revised edition of the Stuart biography in 2017 alongside Geoffrey Elliott's biography of John Lodwick brought to public attention the Stuart-Lodwick association of writers who took different sides in WWII and thereafter formed an ideological friendship. 

Kiely's poetry such as the collection Breakfast with Sylvia, published in 2005 received the Kavanagh Fellowship in 2006, was highly praised in America and Ireland by leading poets, ‘Kiely has a reputation as strong in Europe and the US as it is here'. The portrait of Kevin Kiely by Maeve McCarthy RHA gained the Ireland-US Council Portrait Award in 2006.

Besides book publication and work in many anthologies, his poetry has appeared in The Edinburgh Review, Poetry Ireland Review, Adrift (New York), Foolscap (London), Oasis (London), Acumen (UK), Other Poetry (UK), Cyphers, The Literary Review (New Jersey), Chapman (Scotland), Southword, Cork Literary Review, The Black Mountain Review, The Shop, Fortnight, Storm (Scotland), Touchstone (UK), Stony Thursday Book, Idaho Arts Quarterly, The Journal: Cumbria (UK), Decanto (UK), The Poetry Bus, The Sunday Independent, Revival Literary Journal, Red Poetry (Wales), Irish American Post, The Minetta Review (New York), Wild Violet Magazine, Pinched (London), Underground Press, (New York), SPRING: the journal of the ee cummings society, The Laughing Dog (US), ANU/A New Ulster 38, New Poetry International, Café Review (USA), Village: politics and culture, Pratik.

Kiely's plays, Multiple Indiscretions (1997) and Children of No Importance (2000), have been produced by RTÉ as well as "In This Supreme Hour" at the Derry Playhouse in 2016. He is also a successful novelist for young readers. A Horse Called El Dorado won the CBI Bisto Award in 2006. SOS Lusitania (2013) is a novel about war, politics and conspiracy theory was the One Book One Community Choice in the Centenary Year of the Lusitania for 2015 during The Remember the Lusitania Project. His most recent adult fiction is The Welkinn Complex, which exposes psychiatric practice and the pharmaceutical industry, while UCD Belfield Metaphysical: a retrospective is a collection of poems published in 2017.

Kiely received Arts Council Literature Bursary Awards for his writings in 1980, 1989, 1990, 1998, 1999, 2004, A Bisto Award in 2005 and The Patrick Kavanagh Fellowship in Poetry 2006.

Criticism
Kiely had begun reviewing poetry and literature, first with John Mulcahy's Hibernia, and later for various publications including The Examiner and Books Ireland. He became New Writing Editor and later Literary Editor (2000–2005) on Books Ireland at the invitation of its founder, Jeremy Cecil Addis, in 1995. He writes extensive and controversial criticism in Hibernia, Irish Examiner, The Democrat Arts Page, Irish Studies Review, Honest Ulsterman, Fortnight, Books Ireland, The London Magazine, The Irish Book Review, Poetry Ireland Review, Irish Times, Irish Arts Review, Irish Literary Review, Idaho Arts Quarterly, Humanities (DC), Village Magazine: politics and culture, The Journal of the E. E. Cummings Society, The Wallace Stevens Journal, The Robert Frost Review and MAKE IT NEW.

Kiely's poetry criticism is not just confined to homegrown Irish publishing which he has extensively commented on in many reviews and surveys. He questioned the pervasively state-funded poetry scene amidst the arts in general "amidst cliques and cabals", and made public the lack of accountability of many arts institutions. He launched vociferous and persistent criticism of institutions such as Aosdána, which he feels are anathema to the identity and autonomy of the serious artist. His statements about the Arts Council's Aosdána reflect the wider concern along with other artists such as Robert Ballagh in relation to public funding channels devoid of accountability.

His literary criticism reached national news when he reviewed President Michael D. Higgins' Selected Poems in 2012 calling his poems "crimes against literature". Paul Durcan, quoted by The Irish Central, defended Michael D. Higgins, who, in his view, "has an absolute commitment to the spirit of poetry." Kiely responded through the Sunday Independent "In supporting the poetry of President Higgins, the Aosdana group prove that their own critical faculty and writing is of the same standard". Kiely's recent works in  criticism, Harvard's Patron Jack of all Poets, about the Woodberry Poetry Room, and critical exegesis Seamus Heaney and the Great Poetry Hoax, prompted the American poet Carlo Parcelli to comment 'Kiely has unmasked a fraud that as he predicted years ago has burgeoned into an institutional conspiracy to honour the mediocre and the sham.' 

The publication of Arts Council Immortals albeit the unofficial biography of the Arts Council 1951-2020 was praised by independent underground arts practitioners, writers and poets but has also involved legal action behind the scenes and unease among establishment commentators including John Burns who found it 'makes Finnegans Wake look like a Ladybird book'

Epic poetry
 
In 2011, Kiely began cross-community workshops and talks in Northern Ireland, sporadically based in Derry with the Eden Place Arts Centre and with Pauline Ross’s Playhouse Theatre which resulted in various writers' groups anthologies, as well as in 2021 consulting-editor to Pamela Mary Brown’s Questions of Legacy: Interviews with Disabled Civilian Survivors of the Sectarian War the book, transcripts and podcasts. Ten years contact with Ireland’s peace process region, resulted in the two volumes of Yrland Regained: Central Cantos ‘structured’ within American modernist poetry techniques which evokes the Six Counties War (1966-1998) and Ireland’s centuries struggle towards full independence and unity. With Brown, he co-wrote the poetry for the short film ‘O City, City’ a heritage commission by the Derry City and Strabane District Council in 2021.

Published works
 Pieta, The Anthology (short fiction) ed. Leland Bardwell Co-Op Books Dublin 1982 
 Quintesse, St Martin's Press, New York 1985. Gavin Witt, English Major, Yale University wrote a study of Quintesse, 1988 
 Mere Mortals, Poolbeg, Dublin 1989 (Short-List Hughes & Hughes Fiction Prize 1990) 
 Multiple Indiscretions, RTÉ 1997 
 Children of No Importance, RTÉ 2000 
 Plainchant for a Sundering (long-poem) Lapwing, Belfast 2001 
 A Horse Called El Dorado, O'Brien Press, Dublin 2005 (Bisto Honour Award, 2006) 
 Breakfast with Sylvia, Lagan Press, Belfast 2005/US Edition 2007; Awarded the Patrick Kavanagh Fellowship in Poetry 2006 
 Francis Stuart: Artist and Outcast, Liffey Press, Dublin 2007, Areopagitica Publishing 2017 (Authorised Biography) 
 Something Sensational To Read in the Train (anthology foreword: Brendan Kennelly) Lemon Soap Press, Dublin 2005 
 Catullus: One Man of Verona Anthology, ed. Ronan Sheehan Farmar & Farmar Ltd 2010 
 The Welkinn Complex Number One Son Publishing Co., Florida USA 2011; Areopagitica Publishing (Revised Edition) 2016 
 Ends & Beginnings: Anthology eds. John Gery and William Pratt AMS Press Inc, New York 2011 Windows Anthology eds. Heather Brett and Noel Monahan 2012 
 In Place of Love and Country eds. Richard Parker & John Gery Crater Press, London 2013 
 SOS Lusitania, O'Brien Press, Dublin 2013 
 The Taking of Christ (co-authored with Pamela Mary Brown) 2013
 1916-2016 An Anthology of Reactions eds. John Liddy & Dominic Taylor The Limerick Writers' Centre, 2016
 UCD Belfield Metaphysical: a retrospective , Lapwing Press, Belfast 2017
 The Office on Serious Street, Writers Room Anthology, Eden Place Arts Centre, Derry 2017 
 Seamus Heaney and the Great Poetry Hoax  Areopagitica, 2018  
 Harvard’s Patron: Jack of All Poets  Areopagitica, 2018
 UCD Belfield Metaphysical: New & Selected Poems Areopagitica, 2018
 Dracula and Luna (co-authored with Pamela Mary Brown) Areopagitica 2018
 Cromwell Milton Collins Carson from "Yrland Regained: Central Cantos" Cyberwit, Allahabad, India 2020
 Arts Council Immortals Areopagitica 2020
 I shot the President's verse: Selected Journalism Areopagitica 2021
 Yrland Regained: Central Cantos I & II Areopagitica 2022
 Hotel Baudelaire: reservations and cancellations Areopagitica 2022

Further reading
 Kiely, Kevin "Aos Dána: where self-selection meets self-praise, in a faux Gaelic, Haugheyesque arts beano", Village Magazine, February–March 2014.
 Kiely, Kevin "Kevin Kiely puts the boot into Seamus Heaney", Village Magazine, August 2014.
 Kiely, Kevin "Enduring Irish Sculpture", Village Magazine, September 2014. 
 Kiely, Kevin "our top-heavy Arts Council", Village Magazine, March 2015.
 Kiely, Kevin "Failing again to find Caravaggio", Village Magazine, July 2015.  
 Kiely, Kevin "Canon and on and on", Village Magazine, September 2015. 
 Parcelli, Carlo "Shame us, Séamus or at least say something genuine", Village Magazine, June 2018.

References

External links
 

1953 births
Male dramatists and playwrights from Northern Ireland
International Writing Program alumni
Living people
Male novelists from Northern Ireland
Male poets from Northern Ireland
People from Warrenpoint
20th-century novelists from Northern Ireland
21st-century novelists from Northern Ireland
20th-century British male writers
21st-century British male writers
People educated at Blackrock College